The 2008–09 Terceira Divisão season was the 59th season of the competition and the 19th season of recognised fourth-tier football in Portugal.

Overview
The league was contested by 92 teams in 7 divisions of 10 to 14 teams.

Terceira Divisão – Série A
Série A – Preliminary League Table

Série A – Promotion Group
Série A – Relegation Group A
Série A – Relegation Group B

Terceira Divisão – Série B
Série B – Preliminary League Table

Série B – Promotion Group
Série B – Relegation Group A
Série B – Relegation Group B

Terceira Divisão – Série C
Série C – Preliminary League Table

Série C – Promotion Group

Série C – Relegation Group A

Série C – Relegation Group B

Terceira Divisão – Série D
Série D – Preliminary League Table

Série D – Promotion Group
Série D – Relegation Group A
Série D – Relegation Group B

Terceira Divisão – Série E
Série E – Preliminary League Table

Série E – Promotion Group
Série E – Relegation Group A
Série E – Relegation Group B

Terceira Divisão – Série F
Série F – Preliminary League Table

Série F – Promotion Group
Série F – Relegation Group A
Série F – Relegation Group B

Terceira Divisão – Série Açores
Série Açores – Preliminary League Table

Série Açores – Promotion Group

Série Açores – Relegation Group

Footnotes

External links
 Portuguese Division Three – footballzz.co.uk

Portuguese Third Division seasons
Port
4